This is a list of awards and nominations received by American actor, singer, songwriter, record producer, and comedian Jamie Foxx.

Major associations

Academy Awards

British Academy of Film and Television Arts Awards

Golden Globe Awards

Grammy Awards

Screen Actors Guild Awards

Popular awards

MOBO Awards

MTV Movie & TV Awards

MTV Video Music Awards

Nickelodeon Kids' Choice Awards

Teen Choice Awards

Other awards and nominations

American Black Film Festival

American Music Awards

BET Awards

Black Reel Awards

Blockbuster Entertainment Awards

Boston Society of Film Critics

Dallas–Fort Worth Film Critics Association

Critics' Choice Awards

Florida Film Critics Circle

Golden Raspberry Awards

Hollywood Critics Association Awards

Hollywood Film Festival

Independent Spirit Awards

Kansas City Film Critics Circle

Las Vegas Film Critics Society

London Film Critics' Circle

NAACP Image Awards

National Board of Review

National Society of Film Critics

New York Film Critics Circle

Online Film Critics Society

People's Choice Awards

Satellite Awards

Soul Train Music Awards

Southeastern Film Critics Association

TV Land Awards

Vancouver Film Critics Circle

Vibe Awards

Washington DC Area Film Critics Association

Women in Film Crystal + Lucy Awards

References

External links
 

Foxx, Jamie